The men's pole vault event at the 2021 European Athletics Indoor Championships was held on 6 March at 10:04 (qualification) and 7 March at 17:05 (final) local time.

Medalists

Records

Results

Qualification
Qualification: Qualifying performance 5.75 (Q) or at least 8 best performers (q) advance to the final.

Final

References

2021 European Athletics Indoor Championships
Pole vault at the European Athletics Indoor Championships